The 2017 Antonio Savoldi–Marco Cò – Trofeo Dimmidisì was a professional tennis tournament played on clay courts. It was the sixteenth edition of the tournament which was part of the 2017 ATP Challenger Tour. It took place in Manerbio, Italy between 21 and 27 August 2017.

Singles main-draw entrants

Seeds

 1 Rankings are as of 14 August 2017.

Other entrants
The following players received wildcards into the singles main draw:
  Julian Ocleppo
  Andrea Pellegrino
  Gianluigi Quinzi
  Andrea Vavassori

The following player received entry into the singles main draw as a special exempt:
  Elias Ymer

The following player received entry into the singles main draw as an alternate:
  Miljan Zekić

The following players received entry from the qualifying draw:
  Federico Gaio
  Gianluca Mager
  Maximilian Neuchrist
  Lorenzo Sonego

The following player received entry as a lucky loser:
  Lenny Hampel

Champions

Singles

  Roberto Carballés Baena def.  Guillermo García López 6–4, 2–6, 6–2.

Doubles

  Romain Arneodo /  Hugo Nys def.  Mikhail Elgin /  Roman Jebavý 4–6, 7–6(7–3), [10–5].

External links
Official Website 

Antonio Savoldi-Marco Cò - Trofeo Dimmidisì
Antonio Savoldi–Marco Cò – Trofeo Dimmidisì
2017 in Italian tennis